Ruth Patterson, OBE (born 1944), was the first woman to be ordained to the ministry of the Presbyterian Church in Ireland and is a director of the charity Restoration Ministries.

She received her B.A. in social studies from Queen's University, Belfast in 1966, followed by an M.A. from the University of Toronto in 1968, and an additional degree from the University of Edinburgh in 1974. She was ordained as a minister in the Presbyterian Church in 1976.

Honours 
2000 University of Edinburgh/Royal Bank of Scotland Alumnus of the Year
2001 Honorary Doctor of Divinity, Presbyterian Theological Faculty, Ireland
2003 OBE for public service

References

1944 births
Living people
Presbyterian ministers from Northern Ireland
Clergy from Belfast
Officers of the Order of the British Empire